Claudio Ong Teehankee, CCLH (April 18, 1918 – November 27, 1989) was the 16th Chief Justice of the Supreme Court of the Philippines from 1987 to 1988.

He was also the most senior associate justice and chairman of the First Division of the Supreme Court of the Philippines.

Personal life
Teehankee was born on April 18, 1918 in Manila, Philippines.

His father, José Tee Han Kee, immigrated to the Philippines in 1901 from Fujian province in China. He was a close associate and friend of Sun Yat-Sen, and was active in the struggle to liberate China from the Qing dynasty.

Teehankee was married to Pilar D. Javier with whom he had nine children. He received his A.B. summa cum laude in 1938 and LL.B. summa cum laude in 1940 from the Ateneo de Manila. He also garnered first place in the 1940 bar examination with an average of 94.35 percent.

He became Secretary of Justice under the Marcos administration in 1967 before being appointed as associate justice in 1968.
His son Claudio Jr. though would be imprisoned for homicide in the early 1990s. The death penalty was reinstated because of concurrent debates after reactions to the public sentence were mixed.

Accomplishments

He was known as the court's "activist" justice because of his dissenting opinions in many vital cases affecting the Marcos administration. He was the lone dissenter in many cases, such as the High Tribunal's decision upholding the constitutionality of the Judiciary Reorganization Act of 1980. He also dissented in policies which would seem to curtail the basic liberties of people. For a time, Teehankee and Justice Cecilia Muñoz-Palma would dissent together. After Muñoz-Palma's retirement, he was joined by Associate Justice Vicente Abad Santos in dissenting.

It was this activism that made Marcos 'by-pass' him twice for the position of Chief Justice (the most senior associate justice is most likely to succeed after the retirement of the Chief Justice) in 1985. It was after the removal of Marcos that he was appointed Chief Justice by Corazon Aquino in 1987.

Later years

After his retirement, he was appointed as the Philippine Ambassador to the United Nations, where he died of cancer in Manhattan, New York on November 27, 1989 at the age of 71. He is interred at the Libingan ng mga Bayani.

See also
 Chief Justice of the Supreme Court of the Philippines
 Associate Justice of the Supreme Court of the Philippines
 Supreme Court of the Philippines
 Constitution of the Philippines

References

Further reading
Cruz, Isagani A. (2000). "Res Gestae: A Brief History of the Supreme Court". Rex Book Store, Manila

Sources
Supreme Court of the Philippines – Claudio Teehankee biodata

External links

1918 births
1989 deaths
20th-century Filipino lawyers
Associate Justices of the Supreme Court of the Philippines
Ateneo de Manila University alumni
Burials at the Libingan ng mga Bayani
Deaths from cancer in New York (state)
Centro Escolar University alumni
Chief justices of the Supreme Court of the Philippines
Filipino judges
Filipino people of Chinese descent
People from Manila
Secretaries of Justice of the Philippines
Ferdinand Marcos administration cabinet members
Filipino politicians of Chinese descent
Individuals honored at the Bantayog ng mga Bayani
Judges and justices honored at the Bantayog ng mga Bayani
Permanent Representatives of the Philippines to the United Nations